Paul Stein may refer to:

Paul Stein (entomologist) (1852–1921), German museum curator and entomologist 
Paul E. Stein (1944–2002), superintendent of the United States Air Force Academy
Paul L. Stein (1892–1951), Austro-British film director
Paul Stein (judge) (born 1939), retired Australian judge